Second-seeded Roy Emerson defeated Rod Laver 1–6, 6–3, 7–5, 6–4 in the final to win the men's singles tennis title at the 1961 Australian Championships.

Seeds
The seeded players are listed below. Roy Emerson is the champion; others show the round in which they were eliminated.

  Rod Laver (finalist)
  Roy Emerson (champion)
  Bob Mark (third round)
  Bob Hewitt (third round)
  Mike Sangster (quarterfinals)
  Christian Kuhnke (quarterfinals)
  Bob Howe (third round)
  Fred Stolle (semifinals)
  Wayne Reid (third round)
  Ken Fletcher (quarterfinals)
  Sergio Tacchini (second round)
  Barry Phillips-Moore (semifinals)

Draw

Key
 Q = Qualifier
 WC = Wild card
 LL = Lucky loser
 r = Retired

Finals

Earlier rounds

Section 1

Section 2

Section 3

Section 4

External links
 1961 Australian Championships on ITFtennis.com, the source for this draw

1961 in tennis
1961
1961 in Australian tennis